Phanaeus quadridens is a species of dung beetles in the family Scarabaeidae.

Subspecies
These two subspecies belong to the species Phanaeus quadridens:
 Phanaeus quadridens borealis Olsoufieff, 1924
 Phanaeus quadridens quadridens

References

Further reading

External links

 

quadridens
Articles created by Qbugbot
Beetles described in 1835